Maitland railway station is located on the Main Northern line in New South Wales, Australia. It serves the city of Maitland opening on in 1880 as West Maitland being renamed on 1 April 1949. It is the junction station for the Main Northern and North Coast lines. It was added to the New South Wales State Heritage Register on 2 April 1999.

History

The Great Northern Railway was built through Maitland in the 1850s and extended to Lochinvar in July 1860. Maitland was serviced by Victoria Street, East Maitland and High Street when it opened however it was not until 1880 that what is now Maitland's principal station opened as West Maitland.

Initially the station comprised only one platform, the present Platform 1. The station expanded with an island platform and footbridge constructed in 1914 followed in 1933 by another island platform. In April 1949 in recognition of its position as Maitland's primary station it received its present name. A bay platform was located at the eastern end of Platform 1 for terminating services from Newcastle, it was removed in the 1990s.

The station is susceptible to floods. In the 1955 floods the signalbox was washed away with its replacement constructed on stilts. This closed on 27 October 1990 and has been leased to a model railway club. The high water marks have been marked on the building on Platform 1. Flood gates have been installed at the northern end of the platforms. A new signal box opened opposite the station on 17 December 1990.

A yard is located east of the station. It is mainly used to stable railway maintenance equipment, although each April is used as a depot for locomotives attending the Hunter Valley Steamfest.

Immediately east of the station the Main Northern and North Coast lines split, while about 500 metres west of the station the South Maitland Railway line to Pelton branches south.

On 27 July 2015 Maitland was the first station to receive a Regional Customer Support Centre covering the Central Coast, Hunter and North West areas of NSW.

Platforms & services
Maitland has five platforms, although only four are used by passenger trains. It is serviced by NSW TrainLink Hunter Line services travelling from Newcastle to Muswellbrook, Scone, Telarah and Dungog.

It is also serviced by NSW Trainlink Xplorer and XPT long-distance services from Sydney to Armidale, Moree, Grafton, Casino and Brisbane.

Events
Each April, Maitland station is the focal point for the Hunter Valley Steamfest, an event that has been held annually since 1986, with exception to 2020.

Transport links
Hunter Valley Buses operates seven routes via Maitland station:
179: Stockland Green Hills to North Rothbury via Rutherford with limited services to Hanbury Estates
180: Stockland Green Hills to Singleton Heights via Rutherford
180x: to  express via ,  and  Stations
181:Aberglasslyn to Woodberry via Metford
182: Thornton to Rutherford via Ashtonfield
183: Rutherford to Tenambit via Telarah
185: to Largs via Bolwarra, with limited services to Paterson and Gresford 
192: to South Maitland and Louth Park

Rover Coaches operates two routes via Maitland station:
164: to Cessnock via Kurri Kurri, limited services operate to Stockland Green Hills
166: Stockland Green Hills to Kurri Kurri via Gillieston Heights, Heddon Greta & Pelaw Main

Sid Fogg's operates one route via Maitland station:
 Newcastle station to Dubbo station via the Golden Highway

Description 

The station complex includes two brick station buildings, the platform 1 building completed in 1880 of type 5 first-class design, and the platform 2/3 building completed in 1914 of type 11 initial island/side building design. The signal box is of elevated timber on a steel frame and was completed in 1956, and the booking office, on the street facing Railway Parade, was completed in 1948. There is also a pedestrian overbridge connecting the road to the platforms.

Heritage listing 
The Maitland station group is of high significance both as a complete unit, and for its individual elements. The various buildings date from the earliest surviving on the north line through to the 1950s forming a harmonious group with an important civic contribution particularly from the booking office and first class station building. The site is of additional interest with the relationship of the first class building to the alignment of platform 1 and the extended awning down to the realigned and lowered line which is unique in the railway system. The main station building is of high significance and is a very important building in Maitland and in the State particularly with its adaptive awning structure. The other buildings at the station including the signal box are significant and indicate the importance of the location as a commercial centre and junction station, particularly with the adjacent Maitland colliery system which linked with the main line nearby to the west. The number of platforms also indicate the importance of the site for changing trains and as a centre of commerce and the furthest link of the Newcastle commuter rail system.

References

External links

Maitland station details Transport for New South Wales

Easy Access railway stations in New South Wales
Maitland, New South Wales
Railway stations in the Hunter Region
Railway stations in Australia opened in 1880
Regional railway stations in New South Wales
New South Wales State Heritage Register
Main North railway line, New South Wales
North Coast railway line, New South Wales